Grand Lee Bush (born December 24, 1955) is a former American actor of stage, television and major motion pictures.

Early life and education
Bush was born in Los Angeles, California, the son of actor Robert Bush and his wife Essie Bush. Shakespearean-trained, Bush studied film and theatre at the Los Angeles City College Theatre Academy, University of Southern California and the Strasberg Academy in Hollywood. He continued his education by performing at the historic Globe Theatre, the Mark Taper Forum in Los Angeles, and the annual Shakespeare Festival in Garden Grove, California.

Career
In 1977 he landed a recurring role on the CBS sitcom Good Times. Bush later acted in other television episodics and miniseries, including Roots, before joining the cast of the rock musical Hair in 1979, in which he performed a solo. Bush also performed in other musical dramas, including the TV series Fame and the feature film Streets of Fire.

In 1983, Bush won a nomination for a Canadian Genie Award in the category of "Best Performance by a Foreign Actor" for his role in the feature film Hard Feelings.

Bush appeared in such blockbusters as Lethal Weapon, Hollywood Shuffle, Die Hard, and Colors, the latter of which sparked a friendship between Bush and director Dennis Hopper and Hopper directed Bush in a total of three feature films: Colors, Chasers, and Catchfire.  Bush was cast in the 1989 James Bond feature film Licence to Kill. He portrayed a lieutenant in the horror film The Exorcist III and had a small role in Demolition Man.  Bush also played actor Todd Bridges' father in Building Bridges, an autobiographical short film about the rise and fall of the child star of Diff'rent Strokes.

In 1994, Bush was cast in the role of Balrog in the action/comedy Street Fighter, directed by Steven E. de Souza. The ensemble cast also included Jean-Claude Van Damme, Kylie Minogue, Ming-Na and Raúl Juliá. To prepare for his role, Bush trained with kickboxing champion Benny Urquidez in Bangkok, Thailand, and Brisbane, Australia.

More than 35 feature films in which Bush has appeared have been archived as Turner Classic Movies.

Personal life
In 1991, Bush met his future wife, Sharon Crews, on the set of Freejack, a science fiction feature that stars Emilio Estevez, Rene Russo and Mick Jagger. Crews was on assignment for Black Entertainment Television (BET) to interview Bush, et al., during the Atlanta, Georgia, location filming. They married in 1994.

Filmography

Film

Television

References

External links

1955 births
African-American male actors
American male film actors
American male television actors
Los Angeles City College alumni
Living people
Male actors from Los Angeles
University of Southern California alumni
21st-century African-American people
20th-century African-American people